William DeWitt Alexander (April 2, 1833 – February 21, 1913) was an educator, author and linguist in the Kingdom of Hawaii and Republic of Hawaii.
He then constructed maps for the Territory of Hawaii.

Early life
Alexander was born in Honolulu April 2, 1833. His father was missionary William Patterson Alexander and mother Mary Ann McKinney. He was named after William Radcliffe DeWitt (1792–1867) a Presbyterian pastor of his mother, who convinced her and her brother Edmund McKinney to become missionaries.
He graduated from Punahou School in 1849, and traveled to New England to enroll at Yale.
He received a BA degree from Yale in 1855 as Salutatorian, a Master of Arts in 1858, and was a member of Skull and Bones. He returned to Hawaii and joined the faculty of Punahou School as a professor of Greek and history.
He married Abigail Charlotte Baldwin  (1833–1913), daughter of missionary Dwight Baldwin in 1861.
He became the fourth president of Punahou (then called Oahu College) in the summer of 1864, replacing Cyrus T. Mills. Mills and his wife Susan Tolman Mills then founded Mills College.

Work
During this time Alexander published books on Hawaiian history and the Hawaiian language.
His younger brother Samuel Thomas Alexander founded Alexander & Baldwin with his wife's brother Henry Perrine Baldwin. The swimming pool and athletic field at the school are named for Alexander family members.
In spring 1871 Alexander became Royal Surveyor-General, and Edward Payson Church replaced him as president of Punahou. As the head of the Kingdom's Survey Department, Alexander led a trigonometrical mapping project that eventually produced a map of the islands which the Kingdom showcased at the 1876 World's Fair in Philadelphia. Alexander with Luther Aholo represented the Kingdom of Hawaii at the International Meridian Conference, held in Washington, DC, in October 1884. This conference resulted in the selection of the Greenwich Meridian as an international standard for zero degrees longitude.
On November 6, 1874, Alexander was appointed to the Board of education, and then in 1896 Commissioner of Public Instruction.
After Hawaii was annexed into the United States in 1898, Alexander was surveyor of the Territory of Hawaii.
He assisted the U.S. National Geodetic Survey mapping the islands. He was a founding member of the Hawaiian Historical Society (during its second incarnation in 1893) and served as its first corresponding secretary. He wrote many articles for its journal.

Family and death
Yale awarded him an honorary Doctor of laws degree in 1903.
He died February 21, 1913, at the Queen's Medical Center in Honolulu. He and his wife are buried in the cemetery at Kawaiahaʻo Church, across the street from where he was born.
Daughter Mary Charlotte Alexander (1874–1961) wrote a biography of both her grandfathers and a history of Hawaii.
Daughter Agnes Baldwin Alexander (1875–1971) became a follower of the Baháʼí Faith and author. She learned the Esperanto language and moved to Japan.
He had sons William Douglas Alexander (1861–1936), Arthur Chambers Alexander (1863–1954), and Henry Edward Mansfield Alexander (June 10, 1868—August 22, 1900).
William Douglas (sometimes called W.D. Alexander Jr.), was in San Francisco during the 1906 San Francisco earthquake. He survived with only a few important papers stuffed in his coat.
Arthur became a professor of Physics at the University of California, Berkeley and authored his own textbook.

Works

Family tree

References

External links
 

1833 births
1913 deaths
Writers from Honolulu
School superintendents in Hawaii
Burials at Kawaiahaʻo Church
Punahou School alumni
Yale College alumni
Hawaiian Kingdom politicians
Members of the Hawaiian Kingdom Privy Council
Republic of Hawaii politicians